The defence and intervention frigate or FDI, also known as the Frégate de Taille Intermédiaire or FTI, is a planned class of French frigates. As of February 2022, five ships have been ordered for the French Navy, with the lead ship being named Amiral Ronarc'h, and an additional three, more heavily armed vessels, for the Hellenic Navy, with the lead ship named Kimon.

First steel was cut in October 2019, beginning construction on the lead unit. The lead ship was laid down on 17 December 2021. Commissioning is planned from 2024 onwards.

History 
The Intermediate Frigate (FTI) program was a response to the requirement for fifteen first-class frigates to allow the French Navy to operate in a crisis zone, as recommended in the White Paper on Defense and National Security of 2013.

Defence Minister Jean-Yves Le Drian announced the launch of the five-ship program on 29 May 2015 at the naval aviation base in Lann-Bihoué.  In 2021 it was reported that work on the second and third frigates in the series would be accelerated with first steel cut for modules of the second ship of the class envisaged for October.

The FTIs, of a contained size, would better correspond to the demands of the export markets according to the Direction générale de l'armement (DGA; English: Directorate General of Armaments) and also make it possible to maintain the development and production capacities of the French shipyards.

These ships will incrementally supersede the s, in the role of first rank frigates. In the interim, a modernization of three vessels in the La Fayette class is being undertaken to extend their useful lives into the early 2030s. In November 2022 it was announced that the first two FDI frigates (Amiral Ronarc'h and Amiral Louzeau) would be based at Brest.

The French Defence Ministry announced the award of a contract to DCNS for the development and construction of five intermediate-size frigates (FTIs) intended for the French Navy on 21 April 2017. The frigates will be equipped with electronic systems and sensors developed by Thales and will be equipped with Aster 30 missiles.

 The SEA FIRE all-digital multi-function radar with four fixed antennas, which will meet the requirements of a broad range of missions, from ship self-defence to extended air defence, and can deploy MBDA Aster 15/30.  The first SEA FIRE radar was delivered for integration in the first frigate in April 2021.
 The compact version of the CAPTAS-4 towed-array sonar, delivers the same ultra-long-range detection performance as the original version of CAPTAS-4 with 20% lower weight and a footprint almost 50% smaller.
 The Aquilon integrated digital communications system and an IFF (Identification Friend of Foe) associated with the SEA FIRE radar.
 The SENTINEL system, an advanced digital electronic warfare system built around a modular architecture.

Exports 
In September 2021, Greece signed an agreement with France's Naval Group to purchase three FDI HN frigates with an option for one more for the Hellenic Navy as part of a $5 billion defence package.  The FDI HN export version is also known as the Belharra-class frigate.

It was reported that the Hellenic Navy ships would eventually carry a more extensive weapons fit, capable of carrying up to 32 Aster-30 air defence missiles (in 4 Sylver A-50 or 3 A-50 and 1 A-70 launchers for 8 MdCN missiles. This will permit the Hellenic Navy to operate three ships with 32 air defence missiles plus 21 point defence missiles in a Mk31 21-cell launcher of RAM Block 2B surface-to-air missiles, 8 Block 3 Exocet anti-ship missiles, 2 dual launchers MU90 torpedoes and CANTO torpedo countermeasures. Two of the vessels, destined for the French Navy in 2025, now will be delivered to the Hellenic Navy. The date of the construction agreement was anticipated to be at late 2021 or early 2022.

In December 2021 it was reported that an agreement for construction had been signed by France and Greece with the actual contract for the construction of the ships having been signed on 24 March 2022. In February 2022, documents released by the Greek Parliament indicated that initially the first two frigates for the Hellenic Navy would be equipped similar to their French counterparts in a "Standard-1" configuration (with 16 Sylver A50 cells). By 2027 the two ships would be upgraded to a "Standard-2" configuration with 32 A-50 cells as well as with the RAM Block 2B. The third Hellenic Navy frigate would be built from the outset in the "Standard-2" configuration.

According to the Hellenic Navy, the ships will be named after three great ancient Greek admirals: Cimon, Nearchus and Phormio. These names had previously been used for the ex-US s in service with the Hellenic Navy from 1991 to 2004.

Participation of Greek companies 

Agreements have been signed between Naval Group and Greek companies participating in the frigates' construction. Starting from ship 4 in the program (the French Navy's Amiral Louzeau), some ship blocks are being produced at the Salamis Shipyards in Greece, for both the French and Greek ships. The blocks are then transported to France for the final assembly process.

As of January 2023, 23 contracts had been signed with Greek participating companies, with 10 more scheduled in early 2023.

Ships
Italics indicates estimated date

NOTE: The French Navy does not use the term "destroyer" but rather classifies these vessels as "first-rate frigates". Nevertheless, they are marked with the NATO "D" hull code which ranks them in the destroyer class, instead of ranking them with an "F" designation as frigates.

See also 
Future of the French Navy
Type 31 frigate - equivalent British frigate

References

Frigate classes
Frigates of France
Proposed ships